Shasta Scorchers were an American soccer team based in Redding, California that played in the USISL. The club moved to the USISL Premier League in 1995.

Year-by-year

Defunct soccer clubs in California
1994 establishments in California
1995 disestablishments in California
Association football clubs established in 1994
Association football clubs disestablished in 1995